Budrosa (minor planet designation: 338 Budrosa) is a large Main belt asteroid. It is classified as an M-type asteroid. It was discovered by Auguste Charlois on 25 September 1892 in Nice.

References

External links 
 
 

000338
Discoveries by Auguste Charlois
Named minor planets
000338
000338
18920925